Uryady (Uryaźı) is a rural locality (a village) and the administrative centre of Uryadinsky Selsoviet, Mishkinsky District, Bashkortostan, Russia. The population was 221 as of 2010. There are 5 streets.

Geography 
Uryady is located 19 km southeast of Mishkino (the district's administrative centre) by road. Sabayevo is the nearest rural locality.

References 

Rural localities in Mishkinsky District